Baloch F.C. may refer to 

 Baloch Nushki F.C.
 Baloch Quetta F.C.